Kaolo is an EP by Gnaw Their Tongues, independently released in January 2010.

Track listing

Personnel
Adapted from the Kaolo liner notes.
 Maurice de Jong (as Mories) – vocals, instruments, recording, cover art

Release history

References

External links 
 
 Kaolo at Bandcamp

2010 EPs
Gnaw Their Tongues albums